The Land is a protest song, traditionally sung by the Georgist movement in pursuit and promotion of land value taxation. Its first appearance is from a Chicago Georgist publication, The Single Tax, in 1887 as The Land Song. Until the late 1970s it was sung at the end of each year's Liberal Assembly and was the party anthem of the Liberal Party, until that party merged with the SDP to form the Liberal Democrats. To this day it remains the de facto anthem of the Liberal Democrats, and is sung as the first song of the Liberal Democrats' Glee Club, at the twice-per-year Liberal Democrat Conference, and is the party anthem of the continuity Liberal Party. During the chorus, the phrase 'ballot in our hand' is accompanied by the collective waving of any paper to hand (usually a Liberator song book) by the audience.

Michael Foot, leader of the Labour Party from 1980 to 1983, recalled to the BBC World Service how he heard and learned the song while growing up in a Liberal household in the west of England. Foot said it was the best political song he had heard, imbued with the democratic spirit and designed to put fear in the hearts of the landlords.

The song became a Liberal radical anthem in the aftermath of David Lloyd George's "People's Budget" of 1909 which proposed a tax on land. During the two general elections of the following year, "The Land Song" became the governing Liberals' campaign song. Sheet music was published and a 78rpm disc of the song was released. A recording made at a Glee Club around 1990 has been deposited at the Janey Buchan Political Song Collection in Glasgow. Michael Foot's comments about the song, and snippets of the song itself, featured in a series on political song broadcast on The World Today on the BBC World Service — the entire series is now held by the British Library Sound Archive.

Lyrics
The lyrics have changed slightly over the years. Three versions are included here. The first is from its original 1887 Chicago publication; the second is from a recording issued for the 1910 UK general elections; the third is from the Liberator song book.

(To the tune of "Marching Through Georgia".)

See also
Liberator (magazine)
Henry George
"A Man's A Man for A' That"
God Save Ireland
"The Internationale"

References

External links
 A detailed account of the history of The Land Song, including audio of renditions from 1910 on
 The Liberator songbook version
 Two radio features about The Land Song - and the only recorded version

British anthems
Political party songs
Liberal Party (UK)
Georgism
1887 songs
David Lloyd George